Master Player Screen featuring The Spindle is a short accessory designed for the Pen & Paper role-playing game Dungeons & Dragons.

Contents
Master Player Screen Featuring the Spindle features a gamemaster's screen designed for master level characters up to level 36. This product also included a short adventure titled The Spindle of Heaven.

Screen
The new screen includes hit rolls, saving throws, thief abilities, experience tables for all classes, turning table for clerics, and a spell list for magic users and clerics. It folded out into four sections to hide the Gamemaster's dice roll and prepared work from the players.

The Spindle
The Spindle of Heaven adventure is a short but difficult module for extremely high level characters between 26th and 36th level.

In it the group goes to the great mountain, the Spindle of Heaven, and finds a clue to the secret to immortality. The adventure is just an introduction that leads to a long campaign left up to each individual gamemaster.

Plot summary
The group starts in the village of Nareeb where they hear various rumors about the mysterious spindle. The group travels across the desert battling vicious creatures to reach the Spindle of Heaven.

The group climbs the great mountain and fights creatures sent by the ruler of the region every step of the way.

Eventually the group reaches in the inner sanctum of the main boss and a terrifically high level battle begins. Once the group subdues the Master of the Spindle they can gain information about immortality or any other quest current to the particular campaign.

Enemies
 Airdrake
 Black Pudding
 Djinni, Lesser
 Druj
 Elemental, Air
 Giant, Cloud
 Gray ooze
 Hobgoblin
 Invisible stalker
 Manscorpion
 Rust monster
 Scorpion, Gargantuan
 Sphinx
 Vampire

Publication history
AC7 Master Player Screen Featuring the Spindle was designed by Bruce Nesmith, with a cover by Larry Elmore, and was published by TSR in 1985 as a cardstock screen with an 8-page pamphlet.

Reception

References

External links
 

Dungeons & Dragons modules
Mystara
Role-playing game supplements introduced in 1985